Kenneth Moore Whisenhunt (born February 28, 1962) is an American football coach and former tight end who is currently a special assistant to the head coach for Alabama. He played college football at Georgia Tech and was drafted in the twelfth round of the 1985 NFL Draft by the Atlanta Falcons, with whom he played for four years. He subsequently played two more years with the Washington Redskins and another two with the New York Jets.

Beginning his coaching career in 1995, he was head coach of the Arizona Cardinals from 2007 to 2012 and Tennessee Titans from 2014 to 2015. He led the Cardinals to their first Super Bowl appearance in franchise history during the 2008 season, as well as their first home playoff games in 60 years. However, following the retirement of Kurt Warner, Whisenhunt posted three straight non-winning seasons and was fired by the Cardinals. He was fired by the Titans after compiling a record of 3-20 through one and a half years. Overall, Whisenhunt posted a record of 48-71 as head coach, including a 4-31 record in his last 35 games as a head coach.

Prior to and after his tenures as head coach of the Cardinals and Titans, Whisenhunt served as an offensive coordinator to various NFL teams. He enjoyed success he had with the Pittsburgh Steelers in his three years as their offensive coordinator under Bill Cowher and winning Super Bowl XL over the Seattle Seahawks during the 2005 season. Most recently, Whisenhunt served as the offensive coordinator for the Los Angeles Chargers for four seasons before being fired on October 28, 2019.

College career
After attending the Academy of Richmond County in Augusta, Georgia for high school, Whisenhunt played college football at Georgia Tech (1980–84) where he graduated with a degree in civil engineering. During his senior season, he was an honorable mention All-American. He finished first-team all-ACC during his final two college seasons.

1981: 22 catches for 295 yards and 2 TD.
1982: 15 catches for 208 yards.
1983: 18 catches for 244 yards and 2 TD.
1984: 27 catches for 517 yards and 3 TD.

NFL playing career
His career as a player included four years (1985–88) as a tight end with the Atlanta Falcons, who drafted him in the twelfth round, and then short stints of two seasons each with the Washington Redskins and New York Jets. He retired from the league in 1993 after nine seasons in which he was mostly known as a blocking back. From 1986–1988 with Atlanta, he accumulated 53 catches for 503 yards with 5 TD.

Coaching career

Early career
Whisenhunt began his coaching career at Vanderbilt University, where he coached special teams, tight ends and running backs for the Commodores from 1995 to 1996. In 1997, he returned to the National Football League as the tight ends coach for the Baltimore Ravens. Whisenhunt was a transient in his early years in the league, moving to the staff of the Cleveland Browns in 1999 and to the New York Jets the following season.

Pittsburgh Steelers
In 2001, Whisenhunt was hired by the Steelers to coach their tight ends.  He was able to develop players such as Mark Bruener and Jay Riemersma, both considered past their prime, into excellent tight ends. He also oversaw the early development of tight end Heath Miller, who has been a successful tight end in the league.

Whisenhunt took over the role of offensive coordinator in Pittsburgh for the 2004 season after Mike Mularkey became the head coach of the Buffalo Bills. Although his predecessor Mularkey was known for creating flashy trick plays, Whisenhunt showed great success as more of a cautious innovator, whose well-timed trick plays contrasted the conservative Steelers run game.

One of Whisenhunt's most famous moments as a Steeler is the trick play he called in Super Bowl XL.  With Pittsburgh leading 14-10 over the Seattle Seahawks, Whisenhunt called a wide receiver reverse pass (Antwaan Randle El to Hines Ward, the only TD pass thrown by a WR in Super Bowl history) that allowed Pittsburgh to extend the lead over the Seahawks.

Arizona Cardinals
On January 14, 2007, the Arizona Cardinals hired Whisenhunt as their new head coach, with a contract to receive an average of $2.5 million annually. Whisenhunt had also interviewed for the head coaching position with the Pittsburgh Steelers, Atlanta Falcons, and Miami Dolphins. He was previously interviewed to be the head coach of the Oakland Raiders in February 2006, but he pulled out of talks before an offer could be made.

The Cardinals showed improvement in Whisenhunt's first season, finishing 8-8 after finishing 5-11 the previous two seasons and losing 10 or more games in seven of the previous eight campaigns.  It was their first non-losing season since 1998, though they still failed to make the playoffs.

Going into his second season in 2008, Whisenhunt made the decision to go with veteran quarterback Kurt Warner as his starter. In previous seasons, Warner had split time with the team's younger quarterback Matt Leinart, although Warner started the final 11 games of the 2007 season after Leinart suffered a season-ending injury.  This decision paid off as Warner put up great numbers in leading the Cardinals to a 9-7 regular season record in the 2008 season and the NFC West Division championship, the Cardinals' first division title since 1975, when the team played in St. Louis, and the club's first playoff berth since 1998.  It also allowed the Cardinals to play in only their second home playoff game in franchise history, and their first since winning the NFL championship in 1947, while the team was still in Chicago (they never played a home playoff game in St. Louis despite winning two division titles there).  After defeating the Atlanta Falcons and the Carolina Panthers in the first two rounds of the NFC playoffs, the Cardinals defeated the Philadelphia Eagles in the NFC Championship Game on January 18, 2009 and advanced to the Super Bowl for the first time in franchise history to face his former employer, the Steelers.  Whisenhunt's Cardinals lost Super Bowl XLIII 27-23.

The following season, Whisenhunt led the Cardinals to a 10-6 record and another NFC West title.  In the playoffs, the Cardinals defeated the Green Bay Packers 51-45 in a thrilling overtime victory before losing to the eventual Super Bowl champion New Orleans Saints 45-14 in the next round.

Following the retirement of Warner and a number of other losses at other positions, the Cardinals were not expected to fare well during the 2010 season.  Leinart had been expected to regain his starting quarterback job.  Instead, Whisenhunt installed free agent pickup Derek Anderson as the starter, made rookie Max Hall the backup, and released Leinart. The Cardinals finished 5-11 and last in the division. In 2011, despite ongoing quarterback issues, Whisenhunt and the team management put together a solid young roster that finished with an 8-8 record.

In 2012, Whisenhunt guided the Cardinals to their first 4-0 start since 1974, when the franchise was coached by Don Coryell in St. Louis.  The Cardinals proceeded to lose 9 straight games and in week 14 were blown out by the Seattle Seahawks 58-0. The losing streak finally ended the following week with a 38-10 victory over the Detroit Lions.

On December 31, 2012, Whisenhunt was fired after 3 straight non-playoff seasons. Rod Graves, general manager at the time, was also relieved of his duties.

San Diego Chargers
On January 17, 2013, he was hired as offensive coordinator for the San Diego Chargers, under new head coach Mike McCoy. During the 2013 season under Whisenhunt, the Chargers' finished 5th in the league in total offense, compared to 31st the season before.

Tennessee Titans
On January 13, 2014, the Tennessee Titans hired Whisenhunt as their new head coach. Whisenhunt had also interviewed for the head coaching position with the Detroit Lions and Cleveland Browns. In Whisenhunt's first year, the Titans regressed heavily from their 2013 mark of 7–9. Tennessee finished the 2014 season with a 2–14 record, tying the Buccaneers for the worst record in the NFL.

On November 3, 2015, after starting the season 1–6, the Titans fired Whisenhunt and named Mike Mularkey the interim head coach. Whisenhunt finished with a 3–20 record during his tenure with the team.

Los Angeles/San Diego Chargers (second stint)
On January 13, 2016, the Chargers re-hired Whisenhunt as their offensive coordinator.

On December 4, 2018, it was rumored that Whisenhunt would take the head coaching job at Georgia Tech, where he and AD Todd Stansbury played football at Tech together. However, he ultimately turned down the offer, and would remain at the Chargers.

On October 28, 2019, a day after the Chargers defeated the Chicago Bears, Whisenhunt was fired. At the time, the Chargers were 17th in total yards and 24th in points scored, including failing to score more than 20 points in October.

Penn State Nittany Lions
Whisenhunt joined Penn State in 2021 as an offensive analyst.

Alabama Crimson Tide
On February 16, 2023, it was reported the Whisenhunt had been hired by the Alabama to serve as the special assistant to head coach Nick Saban.

Head coaching record

Personal life
Ken and his wife, Alice, have two children: a son Kenneth Jr., and daughter Mary Ashley.

Whisenhunt earned the rank of Eagle Scout as a boy.

Whisenhunt is an avid golfer. A native of Augusta, Georgia., he worked the 18th hole manual scoreboard as a teenager at the Masters golf tournament, the PGA’s first major of the year. He’s played the course on a number of occasions, including May 2008 when he shot an even par 72 that included an eagle on the par-4 11th hole. Whisenhunt contemplated a career in professional golf and after retiring as a player in 1993, he spent a year away from football and played golf extensively, including competing in the ’94 U.S. Mid-Amateur at the Hazeltine National Golf Club in Chaska, Minn. Whishenhunt’s best career score is a 65 and he has made two holes in one during his lifetime. He also unofficially has a third, but it went for a three on his scorecard after his original tee shot went in the water for a penalty.

References

External links
 Arizona Cardinals bio

1962 births
Living people
American football tight ends
Arizona Cardinals head coaches
Atlanta Falcons players
Baltimore Ravens coaches
Cleveland Browns coaches
Georgia Tech Yellow Jackets football players
New York Jets coaches
New York Jets players
Pittsburgh Steelers coaches
Vanderbilt Commodores football coaches
San Diego Chargers coaches
Los Angeles Chargers coaches
Tennessee Titans head coaches
Washington Redskins players
National Football League offensive coordinators
Academy of Richmond County alumni
Players of American football from Augusta, Georgia